Neal Heaton (born March 3, 1960) is a former Major League Baseball left-handed pitcher who played for the Cleveland Indians, Minnesota Twins, Montreal Expos, Pittsburgh Pirates, Kansas City Royals, Milwaukee Brewers, and New York Yankees from 1982 to 1993.

Heaton was drafted by the Indians in the 2nd round of the 1981 amateur draft from the University of Miami. He was selected to the National League All-Star team in 1990 with the Pirates. On March 10, 1992, the Pirates traded Heaton to the Kansas City Royals for Kirk Gibson. In his 12-season career, he posted an 80-96 record with 699 strikeouts and a 4.37 ERA in 1507.0 innings pitched.

Heaton was inducted into the Suffolk Sports Hall of Fame on Long Island in the Baseball Category with the Class of 1997.

References

External links

1960 births
Living people
All-American college baseball players
American expatriate baseball players in Canada
Cleveland Indians players
National College Baseball Hall of Fame inductees
Kansas City Royals players
Major League Baseball pitchers
Miami Hurricanes baseball players
Milwaukee Brewers players
Minnesota Twins players
Montreal Expos players
National League All-Stars
New York Yankees players
Sportspeople from Queens, New York
Baseball players from New York City
Pittsburgh Pirates players
Charleston Charlies players
Chattanooga Lookouts players
Denver Zephyrs players
Sportspeople from Suffolk County, New York